Castelnuovo (Castarnóvo in local dialect) is a comune (municipality) in Trentino in the northern Italian region Trentino-Alto Adige/Südtirol, located about  east of Trento.

Castelnuovo borders the following municipalities: Telve, Scurelle, Carzano, Borgo Valsugana, Villa Agnedo and Asiago.

Demographic evolution

References

External links
 Homepage of the city

Cities and towns in Trentino-Alto Adige/Südtirol